The United Nations Educational, Scientific and Cultural Organization (UNESCO) World Heritage Sites are places of importance to cultural or natural heritage as described in the UNESCO World Heritage Convention, established in 1972. Estonia accepted the convention on 27 October 1995, making its historical sites eligible for inclusion on the list. The first site added to the list was the Historic Centre (Old Town) of Tallinn, in 1997. The second site, the Struve Geodetic Arc, was added in 2005. This is a transnational site and is shared with nine other countries. Both sites are cultural sites.
In addition to its World Heritage Sites, Estonia also maintains three properties on its tentative list.


World Heritage Sites 
UNESCO lists sites under ten criteria; each entry must meet at least one of the criteria. Criteria i through vi are cultural, and vii through x are natural.

Tentative list
In addition to sites inscribed on the World Heritage List, member states can maintain a list of tentative sites that they may consider for nomination. Nominations for the World Heritage List are only accepted if the site was previously listed on the tentative list. As of 2019, Estonia lists three properties on its tentative list.

References

Estonia
Landmarks in Estonia
 
Protected areas of Estonia
World Heritage Sites
Cultural heritage of Estonia
World Heritage Sites